Astronia is a genus of flowering plants belonging to the family Melastomataceae.

Its native range is Tropical Asia and Taiwan.

Species:

Astronia acuminatissima 
Astronia alata 
Astronia angustifolia 
Astronia apoensis 
Astronia arborea 
Astronia atroviridis 
Astronia beccariana 
Astronia benguetensis 
Astronia brunnea 
Astronia brunneoaenea 
Astronia bullata 
Astronia candolleana 
Astronia chartacea 
Astronia columnaris 
Astronia coriacea 
Astronia corymbosa 
Astronia crassiloba 
Astronia cumingiana 
Astronia cuspidata 
Astronia dioica 
Astronia elaterinervis 
Astronia ferruginea 
Astronia gitingensis 
Astronia glauca 
Astronia glomerata 
Astronia gracilis 
Astronia grandiflora 
Astronia hollrungii 
Astronia katangladensis 
Astronia klabatensis 
Astronia laevis 
Astronia lagunensis 
Astronia ledermannii 
Astronia macrophylla 
Astronia megalantha 
Astronia meyeri 
Astronia papetaria 
Astronia papuana 
Astronia pulchra 
Astronia quadrangulata 
Astronia rolfei 
Astronia rostrata 
Astronia rugata 
Astronia rugosa 
Astronia sabahensis 
Astronia scabrida 
Astronia sericea 
Astronia shungolensis 
Astronia smilacifolia 
Astronia sorongensis 
Astronia spectabilis 
Astronia squamosa 
Astronia stapfii 
Astronia triangularis 
Astronia truncata 
Astronia villosovaginata 
Astronia viridifolia 
Astronia williamsii

References

Melastomataceae
Melastomataceae genera